Revelation 2 is the second chapter of the Book of Revelation or the Apocalypse of John in the New Testament of the Christian Bible. The book is traditionally attributed to John the Apostle, but the precise identity of the author remains a point of academic debate. This chapter contains messages to churches of Ephesus, Smyrna, Pergamum and Thyatira, four of the seven churches of Asia located in modern-day Turkey, with messages for the other three churches appearing in chapter 3.

Text
The original text was written in Koine Greek. This chapter is divided into 29 verses.

Textual witnesses
Early manuscripts containing the text of this chapter include:
Papyrus 98 (2nd century; extant verse 1)
Papyrus 115 (c. 275; extant verses 1–3, 13–15, 27–29)
Codex Sinaiticus (330–360)
Codex Alexandrinus (400–440)
Codex Ephraemi Rescriptus (c. 450; complete)
Papyrus 43 (6th/7th century; extant verses 12–13)

Old Testament references 
 : Psalm

New Testament references 
 : Revelation 12:5; 19:15.

The message to Ephesus (2:1–7)

Verse 1
 "To the angel of the church of Ephesus write,
'These things says He who holds the seven stars in His right hand, who walks in the midst of the seven golden lampstands:"

The message to Smyrna (2:8–11)

Verse 8
"And to the angel of the church in Smyrna write,
'These things says the First and the Last, who was dead, and came to life:'"

Verse 9
"I know your works, tribulation, and poverty (but you are rich); and I know the blasphemy of those who say they are Jews and are not, but are a synagogue of Satan."

The message to Pergamum (2:12–17)

Verse 12
 "And to the angel of the church in Pergamos write,
 'These things says He who has the sharp two-edged sword:'"

Verse 14
 But I have a few things against you, because you have there those who hold the doctrine of Balaam, who taught Balak to put a stumbling block before the children of Israel, to eat things sacrificed to idols, and to commit sexual immorality.

The instruction Balaam gave to Balak, which is here called his "doctrine", was that Balak should get some of the most beautiful women in his kingdom to ply the men of Israel, and draw them into uncleanness, and so to idolatry; this would provoke God's anger to the Israelites, so Balak might get an advantage over them.
 "Come, and I will counsel thee, (speaking to Balak,) go and set up inns, and place in them whorish women, to sell food and drink at a low price: and this people will come and eat and drink, and be drunken, and will lie with them, and deny their God; and they will be quickly delivered into thine hands, and many of them shall fall. 
This now was the stumbling block he taught Balak to lay before them. And elsewhere it is said, 
 "that Balaam, the wicked, gave counsel to Balak, the son of Zippor, to cause the Israelites to fall by the sword; he said to him, the God of this people hates whoredom, cause thy daughters to commit whoredom with them, and ye shall rule over them." 
Both Philo  and Josephus speak of this counsel of Balaam, much to the same purpose. The Samaritan Chronicle says  that this counsel pleased the king, and he sent into the camp of Israel, on a sabbath day, 24,000 young women, by whom the Israelites were so seduced, that they did everything they desired them, which was just the number of those that were slain, .

The message to Thyatira (2:18–29)

Verse 18
"And to the angel of the church in Thyatira write,'These things says the Son of God, who has eyes like a flame of fire, and His feet like fine brass:'"Verse 20
 Nevertheless I have a few things against you, because you allow that woman Jezebel, who calls herself a prophetess, to teach and seduce My servants to commit sexual immorality and eat things sacrificed to idols.The Jerusalem Bible suggests that Jezebel was a "self-styled prophetess of the Nicolaitan sect". Theologian John Gill writes:
She was the daughter of an Heathen, and as she was the wife of Ahab, and therefore a queen, so the "whore of Babylon" calls herself; and as Jezebel was famous for her paintings, so are her pretensions to religion and holiness, and for the gaudiness of her worship; and as she was remarkable for her idolatry, whoredoms, witchcrafts, and cruel persecution of the prophets of the Lord, and for murder, and innocent blood she shed; and as Jezebel, who stirred up Ahab against good and faithful men, so Babylon the great, the mother of harlots, shall be cast into the sea, and be found no more at all: compare  with Revelation 17:1.

See also
 Acts of Apostles
 Balaam
 Balak
 Jesus Christ
 Jezebel
 John's vision of the Son of Man
 John the Apostle
 Seven churches of Asia
 Related Bible parts: Numbers 22, Numbers 24, Numbers 25, Numbers 31, 1 Kings 16, 1 Kings 21, 2 Kings 9, Psalm 2, 2 Peter 2, Revelation 1, Revelation 3, Revelation 17
Synagogue of Satan

Notes

References

Bibliography

External links
 King James Bible – Wikisource
English Translation with Parallel Latin Vulgate 
Online Bible at GospelHall.org (ESV, KJV, Darby, American Standard Version, Bible in Basic English)
Multiple bible versions at Bible Gateway (NKJV, NIV, NRSV etc.)

02